The División de Honor Femenina de Waterpolo is the premier category in the Spanish women's water polo league. Founded in 1988 as Primera División (it took the current name in 2000). It is actually contested by ten teams.

Competition

Format
The División de Honor season takes place between October and May, with every team playing each other home and away for a total of 22 matches. Points are awarded according to the following:
 3 points for a win
 1 points for a draw

Upon completion of regular season, top four teams play championship playoffs.

Promotion and relegation
The bottom team in the standings at the end of the season is relegated to Primera División, while the top team from Primera División is promoted.

List of champions

Titles by team

See also
Copa de la Reina
Supercopa de España

References

External links
Royal Spanish Swimming Federation

 

 
Water polo competitions in Spain
waterpolo
Spain
Water polo